Aviv is a 2003 documentary film about the Israeli singer/songwriter Aviv Geffen.

The film focuses on the life story of the Israeli singer/songwriter Aviv Geffen, who developed from an awkward little boy who was neglected by parents that "would rather buy hash than toys" into a nationally celebrated musician. The film combines old home videos, footage from on stage performances and private interviews in order to track Aviv Geffen's musical success and explain his complex personality.

See also
 Israeli rock

References

External links
 
 Interview with Geffen

2003 documentary films
2003 films
Documentary films about singers
Israeli music
2000s Hebrew-language films
Israeli documentary films
2000s English-language films